The Central District of Osku County is in East Azerbaijan province, Iran. At the National Census in 2006, its population was 56,253 in 15,908 households. The following census in 2011 counted 69,116 people in 21,041 households. At the latest census in 2016, the district had 127,452 inhabitants in 40,586 households.

References 

Osku County

Districts of East Azerbaijan Province

Populated places in East Azerbaijan Province

Populated places in Osku County